Ysaiah 'Stan' Ross is a lawyer, academic and writer.

Ross was educated in New York and California, gaining a law degree from University of California, Berkeley in 1964.  Before teaching law and legal ethics at University of New South Wales he lectured at Auckland University and Makerere University, Uganda.

He was one of the founders of the Berkeley Neighborhood Legal Service in 1967 and in 1968 was appointed its acting director. He has been a consultant to the Law Reform Commission of New South Wales and Papua New Guinea.

He co-authored 16 books, mostly on legal ethics. He wrote columns for the Australian Financial Review from 1999-2003; the Australian Lawyer from 1996-1997 and The Australian from 2004-2008.

Ross retired in 1999, but has continued to teach part time and to give legal ethics advice as a barrister.

Bibliography
 Ethics in law : lawyers' responsibility and accountability in Australia
 Politics of Law Reform, Penguin Books, Melbourne, 1982 
 The Jokes on ... Lawyers

References

External links
Bibliography at the National Library of Australia

American lawyers
American legal writers
Academic staff of the University of New South Wales
University of California, Berkeley alumni
Living people
American male non-fiction writers
Year of birth missing (living people)